The districts of the Church of the Brethren are 24 regional divisions that serve to administer around 1000 congregations of the Church of the Brethren in the United States and Puerto Rico. Districts are divided along state and county lines with membership and geographic scope varying widely. The Church of the Brethren is present in 34 states, Puerto Rico, and Washington, D. C. in addition to their overseas missions.

History and purpose
The district system has existed amongst Schwarzenau Brethren since 1856—prior to the 1881–1883 split—and served the administrative purpose of determining delegates to the Annual Conference who could represent the interests of various communities and report back to them the proceedings. Delegates from districts serve the purpose of raising issues at Annual Conferences (called "queries") which affect the Church of the Brethren at large or which have a scope greater than that of a single congregation or locality—e.g. the ordination of women or how to regulate funds for missions activities. Due to the increase in queries presented to the Annual Conference, in 1856, the Brethren approved the establishment of districts of no less than five churches that would answer queries that had a local scope.

List of districts

Churches by territory

Churches outside the United States

The Church of the Brethren began missionary activities in the late 19th century, which included the establishment of churches in Africa, the Americas, Asia, and Europe. Although most foreign missions closed by the middle of the 20th century, several remain worldwide. The most successful such mission has been  (EYN) (Hausa for "Church of the Children of the Same Mother"), the Nigerian church which was granted autonomy in 1975.

Current foreign missions

Former foreign missions
Canada
Alberta
Arrowwood, Bow Valley (1917–68)
Irricana (1910–68)
Mountain View (1907–22)
Pleasant Ridge (1908–17)
Pleasant Valley (1909–20)
Redcliffe Mission (1917–?)
Second Irricana (1924–64)
Sharon (1906–17)

Saskatchewan
Fairview (1903–33)
Merrington (1920–49)
Vidora: Battle Creek (1910–56)

Mainland China
Guangdong
On Fun, San Tai (1918–48)
Shanxi
Tsin (Chin) Chou
Liao Chou (1912–50)
Ping Ting Choll (1912–50)
Shou Yang Hsien (Show Yang) (1919–50)
T'ai Yuan Fu (1923–50)

Cuba
Omaja (1908?–19)

References

Further reading

External links
Church directory from the Church of the Brethren 

Church of the Brethren
Protestantism-related lists
Denominational subdivisions in North America